Raorchestes munnarensis (Munnar bush frog) is a species of frog in the family Rhacophoridae endemic to Munnar, Kerala, along the Ghat road to Devikulam in the southern Western Ghats, India.

Habitat
It is known only from a small area (less than 20 km2) of secondary vegetation, adjoining the forest along the Ghat road. Specimens were found close to a tea plantation, but not inside the plantation. It breeds by direct development. Its natural habitat is heavily degraded former forest.

Threats
The species is threatened by anthropogenic habitat loss. including habitat clearance for tea and eucalyptus plantations, all the more concerning since there are no other areas of suitable habitat known in the surrounding region.

Conservation Actions
The range of the species is not within any protected area, and protection of the remaining habitat at the species' only known locality is an urgent priority.

References

External links

 

munnarensis
Frogs of India
Endemic fauna of the Western Ghats
Fauna of Kerala
Munnar
Taxonomy articles created by Polbot
Amphibians described in 2009